Rupintrivir (AG-7088, Rupinavir) is a peptidomimetic antiviral drug which acts as a 3C and 3CL protease inhibitor. It was developed for the treatment of rhinoviruses, and has subsequently been investigated for the treatment of other viral diseases including those caused by picornaviruses, norovirus, and coronaviruses, such as SARS and COVID-19.

See also
 3CLpro-1
 Carmofur
 Ebselen
 GC376
 Theaflavin digallate

References 

Antiviral drugs
SARS-CoV-2 main protease inhibitors